Andriy Yevhenovych Khvetkevych (Ukrainian: Андрій Євгенович Хветкевич; born March 8, 1983) is a Ukrainian world-class freediver, world and Ukrainian six-time record holder in three of the four deep disciplines in freediving: CWTB, FIM, CNF.

Biography 
Khvetkevych was born March 8, 1983, in Dnipro. In 2005, Khvetkevych graduated with a bachelor's degree in Cybernetics from the National Metallurgical Academy of Ukraine

In 2008, Khvetkevych graduated with a master's degree in Intellectual Property from the Ukrainian State Institute of Intellectual Property.

In 2017, he started his training in Apnea and Free-diving. In 2018, he set his first National Record for Ukraine in the Vertical Blue Competition with 71m in CNF (Constant Weight No-Fins) discipline, certified by AIDA Judges. He is the first Individual Champion, competing for two different countries: Ukraine by AIDA and USA by CMAS.

His achievements have been recognized with AIDA and CMAS organizations.

Records

References 

 
1983 births
Freedivers
People from Dnipro
Living people